The Beverly City Schools is a community public school district that serves students in pre-kindergarten through eighth grade from Beverly in Burlington County, New Jersey, United States.

As of the 2018–19 school year, the district, comprising one school, had an enrollment of 314 students and 28.5 classroom teachers (on an FTE basis), for a student–teacher ratio of 11.0:1.

The district is classified by the New Jersey Department of Education as being in District Factor Group "B", the second lowest of eight groupings. District Factor Groups organize districts statewide to allow comparison by common socioeconomic characteristics of the local districts. From lowest socioeconomic status to highest, the categories are A, B, CD, DE, FG, GH, I and J.

For ninth through twelfth grades, students in public school attend Palmyra High School in Palmyra, together with students from Riverton, as part of a sending/receiving relationship with the Palmyra Public Schools. As of the 2018–19 school year, the high school had an enrollment of 468 students and 39.3 classroom teachers (on an FTE basis), for a student–teacher ratio of 11.9:1. Beverly's sending relationship has been in place since 1967 after the City of Burlington Public School District decided that it could no longer accommodate students from Beverly at Burlington City High School.

In 2007, Lucille Davy, then Commissioner of the New Jersey Department of Education, appointed a monitor to oversee the financial operations of the district and be responsible to "return fiscal integrity and sound fiscal health to the district", based on the results of financial audits in previous years, including repeat audit findings and general fund deficits.

School
Beverly City School had an enrollment of 304 students in grades PreK-8 in the 2018–19 school year.

In 1948, during de jure educational segregation in the United States, the district had a school for black children.

Administration
Core members of the district's administration are:
Dr. Elizabeth C. Giacobbe, Superintendent / Principal
Dr. Brian F. Savage, Business Administrator / Board Secretary

Board of education
The district's board of education, with nine members, sets policy and oversees the fiscal and educational operation of the district through its administration. As a Type II school district, the board's trustees are elected directly by voters to serve three-year terms of office on a staggered basis, with three seats up for election each year held (since 2012) as part of the November general election. The board appoints a superintendent to oversee the day-to-day operation of the district.

References

External links
Beverly City Schools

School Data for the Beverly City School, National Center for Education Statistics

Beverly, New Jersey
New Jersey District Factor Group B
School districts in Burlington County, New Jersey
Public K–8 schools in New Jersey